The 2012 Worthing Borough Council election took place on 3 May 2012 to elect members of Worthing Borough Council in West Sussex, England. One third of the council was elected, including a double vacancy in Offington ward. The Conservative Party remained in overall control of the council.

The composition of the council after the election was:
Conservative: 24 (+1)
Liberal Democrat: 12 (+1)
Independent: 1 (-2)

Election result

Ward results

References

2012 English local elections
2012
2010s in West Sussex